Sounds of Joy is a studio album by the American jazz saxophonist Joe Lovano, recorded on January 26, 1991, and released on the Enja Records label.

Track list
All compositions by Joe Lovano

"Sounds of Joy" – 6:31
"Strength and Courage" – 6:35
"I'll Wait and Pray" – 4:30
"Cedar Avenue Blues" – 7:00
"Bass and Space" – 7:52
"Ettenro" – 9:32
"Until the Moment Was Now" – 4:19
"This One's For Lacy" – 8:21
"23rd Street Theme" – 5:33

Personnel
Anthony Cox - bass
Ed Blackwell - drums
Joe Lovano - tenor saxophone, soprano saxophone, alto clarinet

References

External links
 

Enja Records albums
Joe Lovano albums
1991 albums